Talachevo (Talas) is a rural locality (a selo) in Burikazganovsky Selsoviet, Sterlitamaksky District, Bashkortostan, Russia. The population was 895 as of 2010. There are 9 streets.

Geography 
Talachevo is located 22 km northwest of Sterlitamak (the district's administrative centre) by road. Sadovka is the nearest rural locality.

References 

Rural localities in Sterlitamaksky District